Arizal may refer to:

 Isaac Luria, or ARIZaL (1534–1572), Jewish mystic
 Arizal (director) (1943–2014), Indonesian film director
 Arizal Effendi (1949–2008), Indonesian diplomat
 Arizal, a character in the 2020 American animated series Recorded by Arizal
 Arizal, Jammu and Kashmir, a village in India